Edward William Parry Jr. (January 29, 1918 – February 23, 2016) was an American professional basketball player. He played in the National Basketball League for the Detroit Eagles and Detroit Gems. In three total NBL seasons, he averaged 5.6 points per game.

References 

1918 births
2016 deaths
American men's basketball players
American military personnel of World War II
Basketball players from Detroit
Detroit Eagles players
Detroit Gems players
Forwards (basketball)
Guards (basketball)
Professional Basketball League of America players